Herbert Bunker (August 24, 1896 – December 6, 1980) was an American college athlete, coach and administrator. He played four varsity sports at the University of Missouri, earning All-America honors in basketball for all three of his varsity seasons. He then went on to coach football and basketball at several schools, later becoming the head football coach and athletic director at Culver–Stockton College.

Bunker was born in Nevada, Missouri and attended the University of Missouri, where he earned varsity letters in football, basketball, baseball and track. It was in basketball where Bunker distinguished himself the most, earning All-Missouri Valley Conference three times. In 1943, the Helms Athletic Foundation retroactively named Bunker to All-America teams for each of these three years. Following his college career, Bunker served as freshman coach for football and basketball at his alma mater. He was hired as assistant football and head basketball coach at Auburn University in 1924. After a short stint as an assistant football coach at Florida, he became head football coach and athletic director at Culver–Stockton College. He later was head of the physical education department at his alma mater.

Bunker died on December 6, 1980 in Columbia, Missouri.

Head coaching record

Football

References

External links
 Missouri Sports Hall of Fame profile
 

1896 births
1980 deaths
All-American college men's basketball players
American men's basketball coaches
American men's basketball players
Auburn Tigers football coaches
Auburn Tigers men's basketball coaches
Baseball players from Missouri
Basketball coaches from Missouri
Basketball players from Missouri
Coaches of American football from Missouri
College men's basketball head coaches in the United States
Culver–Stockton Wildcats athletic directors
Culver–Stockton Wildcats football coaches
Florida Gators football coaches
Missouri Tigers baseball players
Missouri Tigers football coaches
Missouri Tigers football players
Missouri Tigers men's basketball coaches
Missouri Tigers men's basketball players
Missouri Tigers men's track and field athletes
People from Nevada, Missouri
Players of American football from Missouri
Track and field athletes from Missouri